Miguel Amín Escaf (born 5 September 1948) is a Colombian architect and politician, currently serving in the Chamber of Representatives of Colombia.

References

Living people
1948 births
Colombian politicians